Anthony Allen (born August 6, 1988) is a former American football running back. He was drafted by the Ravens in the seventh round of the 2011 NFL Draft. His freshman year of college he attended the University of Louisville and set freshman rushing records. He then played the rest of his college career at Georgia Tech. He attended Jesuit High School in Tampa, Florida.

Professional career

Baltimore Ravens
Anthony Allen was drafted in the 7th Round of the 2011 NFL Draft by the Baltimore Ravens. In 2011 as the team's third running back, Allen received three carries for eight yards against the St. Louis Rams. He won his first Super Bowl ring after the Ravens defeated the San Francisco 49ers in Super Bowl XLVII, 34–31. He was released by the team on August 30, 2013.

Buffalo Bills
On January 14, 2014, Allen signed a 2-year, $1.23M deal.  On May 12, 2014, the Buffalo Bills released Anthony Allen.

Saskatchewan Roughriders
On June 7, 2014, Allen joined the Saskatchewan Roughriders of the Canadian Football League at their training camp. During the off-season the Riders lost Grey Cup MVP Kory Sheets to the Oakland Raiders; leaving a vacancy at the running back position. Allen filled said position on the opening week of the season galloping to 158 rushing yards on 27 carries, with 1 rushing touchdown. Allen went on to be the main rushing back for the Riders in 2014, carrying the ball almost twice as much as any other player. By the close of the regular season he had 169 rushing attempts for 930 yards (5.5 average), with 5 touchdowns: Good enough for 2nd most rushing yards in the league, trailing only Jon Cornish who finished the campaign with 1,082 yards. He also made contributions in the passing game as well, amassing 244 yards on 36 receptions with 3 touchdowns.

References

External links
Georgia Tech Yellow Jackets football bio
NFL.com bio
Saskatchewan Roughriders bio

1988 births
Living people
Players of American football from Tampa, Florida
Players of Canadian football from Tampa, Florida
American football running backs
Canadian football running backs
Louisville Cardinals football players
Georgia Tech Yellow Jackets football players
Baltimore Ravens players
Buffalo Bills players
Saskatchewan Roughriders players
BC Lions players
Jesuit High School (Tampa) alumni